Nehora is a moshav in southern Israel. Located on the coastal plain about 5 km west Kiryat Gat in south-central Israel and just to the east of Route 352, across the road from Noga, it falls under the jurisdiction of Lakhish Regional Council.

History
Nehora was founded in 1955 as part of the program to inhabit Hevel Lakhish and was intended to serve as a center of services for surrounding communities. A shopping center, regional school and the offices of the Lakhish Regional Council are located there.

It is built on the land of the depopulated  Palestinian villages of Karatiyya and al-Faluja.

References 

Moshavim
Populated places established in 1955
1955 establishments in Israel
Populated places in Southern District (Israel)